Behnam Khalili Khosroshahi (born June 2, 1989) is an Iranian cyclist riding for .

Major results

2007
1st Asian Junior Games Time trial
2nd Asian Juniors Games Road Race
2008
1st stage 5 Tour of Iran (Azerbaijan)
1st stage 3 Milad De Nour Tour
1st stage 4 Kerman Tour
1st stage 5 Taftan Tour
2009
1st stage 5 Milad De Nour Tour
2010
1st stage 1 Tour de Singkarak (TTT)
2012
2nd Iranian National Time Trial Championships
2013
 National Time Trial Champion
2014
2nd National Time Trial Championships

References

1989 births
Living people
Iranian male cyclists
People from Sanandaj
21st-century Iranian people